Geoff Craighead (born 14 October 1949) is a former Australian rules footballer who played with South Melbourne in the Victorian Football League (VFL).

Notes

External links 

Living people
1949 births
Australian rules footballers from the Australian Capital Territory
Sydney Swans players